Sauconite is a complex phyllosilicate mineral of the smectite clay group, formula Na0.3Zn3(SiAl)4O10(OH)2·4H2O. It forms soft earthy bluish white to red-brown monoclinic crystals typically massive to micaceous in habit. It has a Mohs hardness of 1 to 2 and a specific gravity of 2.45. Optically it is biaxial positive with refractive index values of nα = 1.550 - 1.580, nβ = 1.590 - 1.620 and nγ = 1.590 - 1.620.
It is found in vugs and seams in the oxidized zones of zinc and copper deposits.  It occurs in association with hemimorphite, smithsonite, chrysocolla, coronadite and various iron oxides.

It was named for the Saucon Valley in Pennsylvania, where it was originally discovered in 1875.

References
 

Smectite group
Sodium minerals
Zinc minerals
Aluminium minerals
Monoclinic minerals
Minerals in space group 12
Minerals described in 1875